Kamal Boulahfane (born 1 July 1976) is a former Algerian runner, who specialized in the 1500 metres. He was born in Djimla.

Competition record

Personal bests
800 metres - 1:46.07 min (2005)
1500 metres - 3:32.44 min (2004)

External links

1976 births
Living people
Algerian male middle-distance runners
Athletes (track and field) at the 2000 Summer Olympics
Athletes (track and field) at the 2004 Summer Olympics
Athletes (track and field) at the 2008 Summer Olympics
Olympic athletes of Algeria
Athletes (track and field) at the 2005 Mediterranean Games
Mediterranean Games competitors for Algeria
21st-century Algerian people
20th-century Algerian people